Osovaya is a rural locality (a village) in Kalininskoye Rural Settlement, Totemsky District, Vologda Oblast, Russia. The population was 21 as of 2002.

Geography 
Osovaya is located 47 km southwest of Totma (the district's administrative centre) by road. Pavlovskaya is the nearest rural locality.

References 

Rural localities in Tarnogsky District